The General Tire Delivers 200 is a  annual ARCA Menards Series race held at Pocono Raceway in Long Pond, Pennsylvania. The inaugural event was held on May 30, 1969, and was won by Bobby Watson. The track has been featured on the ARCA calendar annually since 1987.

History

ARCA ran at Pocono Raceway for the first time in 1969 on a  paved oval, two years before the modern superspeedway was opened. The series would not return to the track until 1983, when it ran just one year, this time on the  superspeedway. The series would take another hiatus at the track, not returning until 1987. That year, the race returned to the calendar, and has remained ever since. From 1988 to 2019, a second race was held at the track. The second race was removed for the 2020 season.

Past winners

Notes 
2002, 2006, 2008: Race extended due to green/white/checker.
2011: Race shortened due to fog.
2022: Race shortened due to darkness.

Multiple winners (drivers)

Multiple winners (teams)

Note: In 1989, Bob Schacht was listed as the owner, but sponsored by Tom Reet Racing.

Manufacturer wins

References

External links
 

ARCA Menards Series races
ARCA Menards Series
Annual sporting events in the United States
Motorsport in Pennsylvania
NASCAR races at Pocono Raceway